The Avenging Conscience: or "Thou Shalt Not Kill" is a 1914 silent horror film directed by  D. W. Griffith. The film is based on Edgar Allan Poe's 1843 short story "The Tell-Tale Heart" and his 1849 poem "Annabel Lee".

Plot

A young man (Henry B. Walthall) interested in the works of Edgar Allen Poe, falls in love with a beautiful woman (Blanche Sweet), but he is prevented by the uncle (Spottiswoode Aitken) that raised him since childhood from pursuing her. Tormented by visions of death and suffering and deciding that murder is the way of things, the young man kills his uncle and builds a wall to hide the body.

The young man's torment continues, this time caused by guilt over murdering his uncle that was overheard by an Italian witness, and he becomes sensitive to slight noises, like the tapping of a shoe or the crying of a bird. The ghost of his uncle begins appearing to him and, as he gradually loses his grip on reality, the police figure out what he has done and chase him down. In the ending sequence, we learn that the experience was all a dream and that his uncle is really alive. They make up, and the nephew gets to marry the sweetheart.

Cast
 Henry B. Walthall as the nephew
 Blanche Sweet as his sweetheart
 Spottiswoode Aitken as the uncle
 George Siegmann as the Italian
 Ralph Lewis as the detective
 Mae Marsh as the maid
 Robert Harron as the grocery boy
 George Beranger
 Wallace Reid⁣ — the doctor

Reception
Dennis Schwartz, labeling the film with a grade of B-, labeled it as a film with important historical value as "the first great American horror film."

References

External links

1914 films
1910s horror drama films
Films directed by D. W. Griffith
American black-and-white films
Films based on The Tell-Tale Heart
American silent feature films
Articles containing video clips
Films based on multiple works
Films based on poems
American horror drama films
1914 drama films
1914 horror films
1910s American films
Silent American drama films
Silent horror films
1910s English-language films